Andrejčje (in older sources Andrečje) is a small settlement in the Municipality of Bloke in the Inner Carniola region of Slovenia.

Name
Until 1990 the settlement was known as Andrejče.

References

External links
Andrejčje on Geopedia

Populated places in the Municipality of Bloke